The Peugeot Flux was a concept car from Peugeot that won the 2007 Peugeot International Design Competition after being unveiled at the Frankfurt Motor Show that year. 

The car was designed by a 20-year-old Romanian, Mihai Panaitescu. It was intended to be a sports car, but was flexible enough to be used for light off-roading.

The vehicle was powered by hydrogen and constructed of plastic body panels, polyurethane seats and an aluminium chassis. The Flux also featured as downloadable content for Project Gotham Racing 4 (2007), in which an Xbox 360 console can be seen on the right-hand side of the dashboard. 

Peugeot auctioned the car in September 2020.

References

Flux
Cars introduced in 2007
All-wheel-drive vehicles
Hydrogen cars
Production electric cars
Roadsters